Octave Féré, real name Charles Octave Moget, (11 October 1815 – 21 April 1875) was a minor 19th-century French writer.

Féré contributed to the magazine  and also participated to the writing of many plays by the dramatist Saint-Yves, including for example Les Amours du comte de Bonneval in 1866.

Works 
 
 
 
 
 

19th-century French writers
Writers from Tours, France
1815 births
1875 deaths